Green Mountains Review is an American literary journal published biannually at Johnson State College in Vermont, founded by senior editor Neil Shepard and currently edited by Elizabeth Powell and Jacob White.

Green Mountains Review was started in 1975. Past contributors of note include Agha Shahid Ali, Marvin Bell, Mark Doty, Stephen Dunn, Donald Hall, Joy Harjo, Laird Hunt, Yusef Komunyakaa, Maxine Kumin, Ann Lauterbach, J. Robert Lennon, Naomi Shihab Nye, Molly Peacock, Benjamin Percy, Robert Pinsky, Alexander Theroux, Anne Waldman, Charles Wright, Mary Oliver, Gary Soto, Robert Walser, Tom Whalen, and David Wojahn.

See also
List of literary magazines

References

External links

Literary magazines published in the United States
Biannual magazines published in the United States
Johnson State College
Magazines established in 1975
Magazines published in Vermont
1975 establishments in Vermont